Jay Rubin (born 1941) is an American academic and translator. He is one of the main translators of the works of the Japanese novelist Haruki Murakami into English. He has also written a guide to Japanese, Making Sense of Japanese (originally titled Gone Fishin'), and a biographical literary analysis of Murakami.

Rubin was born in Washington, D.C., in 1941. Rubin has a PhD in Japanese literature from the University of Chicago. He taught at the University of Washington for eighteen years, and then moved on to Harvard University, which he left in 2008. In his early research career he focused on the Meiji state censorship system. More recently Rubin has concentrated his efforts on Murakami, and Noh drama. His most recent publications are Modern Japanese Writers (Scribners, 2001), and Haruki Murakami and the Music of Words (Harvill, 2002; Vintage, 2005). His translation of 18 stories by Ryūnosuke Akutagawa appeared as a Penguin Classics in 2006. His debut novel, The Sun Gods, was released in May 2015 (Chin Music Press) and explores the relationship between a Japanese mother, Mitsuko, and her adopted, American son, Billy, as they face American internment during World War II.

Rubin also translated the "Thousand Years of Dreams" passages by Kiyoshi Shigematsu for use in the Japanese-produced Xbox 360 game Lost Odyssey.

Rubin's translation of The Wind-Up Bird Chronicle by Haruki Murakami won the 2003 Noma Award for the Translation of Japanese Literature.

Translations

Published works
 Tansman, Alan and Dennis Washburn. (1997). Studies in Modern Japanese Literature: Essays and Translations in Honor of Edwin McClellan. Ann Arbor: Center for Japanese Studies, University of Michigan.  (cloth)
 Making Sense of Japanese: What the Textbooks Don't Tell You (Power Japanese Series, Kodansha's Children's Classics), Kodansha International (March 1, 2002), paperback, 144 pp.,  – first published as Gone Fishin' (1992)

See also
Alfred Birnbaum – another translator of Haruki Murakami
Philip Gabriel – another translator of Haruki Murakami

Notes

References

External links
Jay Rubin – Harvard faculty homepage (archived)

1941 births
Living people
20th-century American translators
21st-century American translators
Japanese–English translators
American Japanologists
Japanese literature academics
University of Chicago alumni
University of Washington faculty
Harvard University faculty